Detail(s) or The Detail(s) may refer to:

Film and television
 Details (film), a 2003 Swedish film
 The Details (film), a 2011 American film
 The Detail, a Canadian television series
 "The Detail" (The Wire), a television episode

Music
 Details (album), by Frou Frou, 2002
 Detail (record producer), Noel Fisher (born c. 1978), American music producer and performer
 The Details, a Canadian rock band

Periodicals
 DETAIL (professional journal), an architecture and construction journal
 Details (magazine), an American men's magazine

See also
 Auto detailing, a car-cleaning process
 Level of detail (computer graphics), a 3D computer graphics concept
 Security detail, a team assigned to protect an individual or group
 Detaille Island, Antarctica